John Perkins Jr. (July 1, 1819 – November 28, 1885) was an American politician who served as a U.S. representative from Louisiana.

Biography
Perkins was born on July 1, 1819, in Adams County, Mississippi, to John and Mary (née Rives) Perkins. He received his early education from private tutors. He graduated from Yale College in 1840 and was initiated, his senior year, into the Skull and Bones Society. He then graduated from the law department of Harvard University in 1842. He was admitted to the bar in 1843 and commenced practice in New Orleans. He also engaged in cotton planting. He was appointed judge of the circuit court for the district comprising Tensas and Madison Parishes in 1851. He was elected as a Democrat to the Thirty-third Congress (March 4, 1853 – March 3, 1855). He was not a candidate for renomination in 1854. He served as chairman of the state secession convention in 1861. He served in the Confederate States Congress from 1862 to 1865. Following the American Civil War, he traveled extensively in Mexico and Europe. He returned to the United States in 1878 and spent the remaining years of his life in Louisiana and Canada. On November 28, 1885, he died in Baltimore, Maryland, and was interred in the Natchez City Cemetery.

See also
List of United States representatives from Louisiana

References

External links

 
 John Perkins Jr. at The Political Graveyard
 John Perkins Papers at University of North Carolina at Chapel Hill
 The John Perkins Family of Northeast Louisiana at RootsWeb.com
 

1819 births
1885 deaths
19th-century American politicians
Burials in Mississippi
Confederate States of America senators
Democratic Party members of the United States House of Representatives from Louisiana
Harvard Law School alumni
Louisiana lawyers
Members of the Confederate House of Representatives from Louisiana
People from Adams County, Mississippi
Signers of the Confederate States Constitution
Signers of the Provisional Constitution of the Confederate States
Yale College alumni
19th-century American lawyers